Bilal Ould-Chikh (born 28 July 1997) is a Dutch professional footballer who plays as a winger for Eredivisie club Volendam.

Club career
Born in Roosendaal, Netherlands, Ould-Chikh joined the youth system at Willem II  in 2011, before moving to FC Twente's youth academy in 2012. He quickly rose through the club's system, making his senior debut on 3 May 2014 against PEC Zwolle by replacing Youness Mokhtar after 69 minutes in a 2–2 draw at De Grolsch Veste.

On 30 July 2015, two days after turning 18, Ould-Chikh signed with Portuguese champions Benfica for five seasons. On 20 September 2015, he debuted for the reserve team in Segunda Liga, replacing João Carvalho after 62 minutes of a 1–0 home win over Gil Vicente.

On 1 March 2017, Benfica announced that Ould-Chikh's contract was terminated. After that Ould-Chikh announced he would start training with the Dutch club FC Utrecht.

On 31 December 2021, Ould-Chikh signed with Volendam until the summer of 2023, with an option to extend.

Career statistics

Personal life
Ould-Chikh is of Moroccan descent. His younger brother Walid is also a footballer.

Honours
Denizlispor
 TFF First League: 2018–19

References

External links
 
 
 

1997 births
Living people
Sportspeople from Roosendaal
Dutch sportspeople of Moroccan descent
Dutch footballers
FC Utrecht players
Association football wingers
Willem II (football club) players
FC Twente players
ADO Den Haag players
Eredivisie players
Liga Portugal 2 players
S.L. Benfica B players
Denizlispor footballers
FC Volendam players
Netherlands youth international footballers
Dutch expatriate footballers
Jong FC Utrecht players
Dutch expatriate sportspeople in Portugal
Dutch expatriate sportspeople in Turkey
Expatriate footballers in Portugal
Expatriate footballers in Turkey
Footballers from North Brabant
Jong FC Twente players